NCC may refer to:

Biology
Neural correlates of consciousness,  neuronal events and mechanisms relating to perception phenomena
Sodium-chloride symporter, abbreviated as NCC

Companies
National Certification Corporation, a nursing specialty certification company
National City Corporation, a leading US bank
NCC AB, a Swedish construction company
NCC Bank, a Bangladeshi bank
Nagasaki Culture Telecasting, a Japanese commercial broadcaster
NCC Group, a British information assurance and cyber security firm

Computers
National Computer Camps, United States
National Computer Conference, United States, 1970s and 1980s
National Computing Centre, in the United Kingdom

Culture

Broadcasting
National Communications Commission, an independent statutory agency in Taiwan
Nigerian Communications Commission, a telecommunication regulatory body for Nigeria

Fiction
Starfleet starship registry prefix in the Star Trek  series

Sport
 Newport Cricket Club, Newport, South Wales
 Nondescripts Cricket Club, Colombo, Sri Lanka
 Nordic Challenge Cup, a sports car racing series
 North Central Conference, a former college athletics conference in the United States
 Norwood Cycling Club, Adelaide, South Australia

Education

United States
Nashua Community College in Nashua, New Hampshire
Nassau Community College in Nassau County, New York
Newport Central Catholic High School, Kentucky
North Central College, Naperville, Illinois
Norwalk Community College, Connecticut
Northampton Community College in Bethelehem, Pennsylvania

Elsewhere
NCC Education, United Kingdom
Nicholson Catholic College, Belleville, Ontario, Canada
Northern Christian College, Laoag City, Ilocos Norte, Philippines
National Communications Coordinator on a university Residence Hall Association

Nature conservation
Nature Conservancy of Canada
Nature Conservancy Council, UK, 1973-1991
AUB Nature Conservation Center, American University of Beirut

Organizations
Israel National Council for the Child, Israeli children's rights advocacy organization
National Cadet Corps (disambiguation),  Military Cadet Corps in various countries
National Chicken Council, in the United States
National Christian Council (disambiguation), in various countries
Nature Conservancy Council, a former public body in the United Kingdom
National Coordinating Center for Communications, a branch of the United States National Cybersecurity and Communications Integration Center

Politics and government
National Capital Commission, a Canadian federal crown corporation
National Citizens Coalition, a right-wing political organization in Canada
National Citizens' Coalition, Zambian political party
Newport City Council, a Welsh local government body
National Civic Council, an Australian political movement
National Conservative Convention, a UK most senior body of the Conservative Party
National Constitution Center located in Philadelphia, Pennsylvania
National Coordination Committee for Democratic Change, a Syrian political bloc
 National COVID-19 Commission Advisory Board, Australian Government board
Natural Capital Committee, an independent body advising England's government on valuing and managing nature
National Communications Centre, a South African intelligence agency
Nelson City Council, a New Zealand local government body

Religion
National Community Church, Washington DC, United States
National Council of Churches, USA, or the National Council of the Churches of Christ in the USA
New Creation Church, Singapore

Other uses
Nanocrystalline cellulose, a freeze-dried form of nanocellulose
National Certified Counselor, a class of psychotherapist
National Construction Code, publication of minimum requirements for buildings in Australia.
New Castle County, Delaware
Non-compete clause
North Crimean Canal
Northern Counties Committee, a former Northern Irish railway
Nederlandse Centrale Catalogus, the Central Catalog of the Netherlands National Library
North Coast Corridor, an infrastructure project in San Diego County, California
National Coursing Club, national registration association for British Bred greyhounds

See also
National Convention Center (disambiguation)